"Leave in Silence" is a song by English electronic music band Depeche Mode. It was released as the third single from their second studio album, A Broken Frame (1982), on 16 August 1982. Recorded at Blackwing Studios, the single became the band's fifth UK Top 20 hit, peaking at No. 18. It was the first Depeche Mode single in the UK to use the "Bong" catalogue number system, which they used until "Heaven" in 2013. Three versions of the track were released on the 7" and 12" singles, while a fourth cut, running at four minutes and fifty-one seconds, was released on A Broken Frame.

The music video for "Leave in Silence" was directed by Julien Temple, and features the band breaking things on a conveyor belt and talking to each other while wearing face paint. The band disliked the video and did not include it on the Some Great Videos VHS compilation album.

Track listings
These are the formats and track listings of major single releases of "Leave in Silence":

7": Mute / 7Bong1 (UK)
 "Leave in Silence" – 4:00
 "Excerpt From: My Secret Garden" – 3:16

12": Mute / 12Bong1 (UK)
 "Leave in Silence (Longer)" – 6:32
 "Further Excerpts From: My Secret Garden" – 4:23
 "Leave in Silence (Quieter)" – 3:42

CD: Mute / CDBong1 (UK)1
 "Leave in Silence" – 4:00
 "Excerpt From: My Secret Garden" – 3:16
 "Leave in Silence (Longer)" – 6:32
 "Further Excerpts From: My Secret Garden" – 4:23
 "Leave in Silence (Quieter)" – 3:42

CD: Sire / 40294-2 (US)1
 "Leave in Silence" – 4:00
 "Excerpt From: My Secret Garden" – 3:16
 "Leave in Silence (Longer)" – 6:32
 "Further Excerpts From: My Secret Garden" – 4:23
 "Leave in Silence (Quieter)" – 3:42

Notes
1: CD released in 1991
All songs written by Martin Gore

Charts

References

External links
 Single information from the official Depeche Mode web site
 AllMusic review 

1982 singles
Depeche Mode songs
Songs written by Martin Gore
Song recordings produced by Daniel Miller
Mute Records singles
Music videos directed by Julien Temple
1982 songs
UK Independent Singles Chart number-one singles